Stigmella ulmiphaga is a moth of the family Nepticulidae. It is found in central Europe (Austria, the Czech Republic, Hungary, Slovakia) and Greece. It is also known from Turkmenistan.

The larvae feed on Ulmus species. They mine the leaves of their host plant. The mine is very similar to the mines of Stigmella ulmivora and Stigmella kazakhstanica.

External links
Fauna Europaea
Nepticulidae from the Volga and Ural region

Nepticulidae
Moths of Europe
Moths of Asia
Moths described in 1942